This is the list of the winners of the Sundance Grand Jury Prize for documentary features.

Winners

1980s
1984: Style Wars
1985: Seventeen
1986: Private Conversations
1987: Sherman's March
1988: Beirut: The Last Home Movie
1989: For All Mankind

1990s
1990: H-2 Worker/Water and Power
1991: Paris Is Burning/American DreamParis Is Burning|FACETS
1992: A Brief History of Time1993: Silverlake Life: The View from Here1994: Freedom on My Mind1995: CrumbSundance 1995 Award Winners". sundance.org. Retrieved November 17, 2012.
1996: Troublesome Creek: A Midwestern1997: Girls Like Us1998: The Farm: Angola, USA/Frat House1999: American Movie2000s
2000: Long Night's Journey Into Day2001: Southern Comfort2002: Daughter from Danang2003: Capturing the Friedmans2004: Dig!2005: Why We Fight2006: God Grew Tired of Us2007: Manda Bala (Send a Bullet)2008: Trouble the Water2009: We Live in Public2010s
2010: Restrepo2011: How to Die in Oregon2012: The House I Live In2013: Blood Brother2014: Rich Hill2015: The Wolfpack2016: Weiner2017: Dina2018: The Price of Free2019: One Child Nation2020s
2020: Boys State2021: Summer of Soul2022: The Exiles''

References

See also
Palm d'Or
Academy Award for Best Documentary Feature

Sundance Film Festival